The 2010 African Women's Handball Cup Winners' Cup was the 26th edition, organized by the African Handball Confederation, under the auspices of the International Handball Federation, the handball sport governing body. The tournament was held from April 7–17, 2010, at the Palais des Sports de Ouagadougou in Ouagadougou, Burkina Faso, contested by 8 teams and won by Atlético Petróleos de Luanda of Angola.

Draw

Preliminary rounds
Times given below are in GMT UTC+0.

Knockout stage
Championship bracket

5-8th bracket

Final standings

See also 
2010 African Women's Handball Champions League

References

External links 
 

African Women's Handball Cup Winner's Cup
2010 in African handball
International sports competitions hosted by Burkina Faso
2010 in Burkinabé sport